Kid Galahad is a 1937 boxing film starring Edward G. Robinson, Bette Davis, Humphrey Bogart and, in the title role, rising newcomer Wayne Morris. It was scripted by Seton I. Miller and directed by Michael Curtiz.

It was remade in 1941, this time in a circus setting, as The Wagons Roll at Night, also with Bogart, and in 1962 as an Elvis Presley musical. The original version was re-titled The Battling Bellhop for television distribution in order to avoid confusion with the Presley remake.

Plot
In Florida, boxing promoter Nick Donati gets double-crossed by his boxer, who throws a fight for a $25,000 bribe from gangster Turkey Morgan. Nick and his girlfriend "Fluff" decide to throw a wild, days-long party with the money they have left, before looking for a new boxing prospect. Nick orders naive young farmer turned hotel bellhop, Ward Guisenberry, to mix some drinks, but he does not know how, as he does not drink. Fluff kindly helps him out. When Morgan, underling Buzz Barret, and Chuck McGraw, his fighter and new heavyweight champion, arrive uninvited, Ward does not like it when the somewhat drunk McGraw pushes Fluff, so he punches him, knocking him to the ground. Nick is impressed, and persuades him to try boxing.

For his first bout, Ward is up against McGraw's experienced brother. Much to everyone's surprise, he wins by knockout. To protect him from Morgan's wrath, Nick sends him, Fluff and ringside assistant Silver Jackson to New York City by train. However, Morgan is waiting outside their usual hotel. He tries to get Ward to sign with him, but Ward knocks him down, insisting he will only sign with Nick.

Desperate, Fluff decides to hide Ward at Nick's mother's farm. There, he meets Nick's sister, Marie, fresh from a convent education. They clash. When Nick finds out, he is furious. He does not want his family to have anything to do with boxing. He takes Ward back to the city.

Ward, rechristened "Kid Galahad", wins a string of fights by knockout. He tells Fluff that his goal is to earn enough to buy a farm. Fluff falls for him, and is crushed when he confides to her that he is in love with Marie. She hides her disappointment, and with her encouragement, he drives up to tell Marie. It turns out that she is just as much in love with him. Fluff leaves Nick, confessing to him that she loves Ward and cannot bear to be around him. She gets a job singing in a nightclub.

In Ward's next fight, Nick orders him to just box and win on points, as knocking his opponent out would build public pressure to fight the champ too soon; Nick wants more time to train his fighter. However, Morgan tells his foe what to say to infuriate Ward. As a result, Ward wins by knockout.

Marie sees the fight; afterward they go out on the town. When she asks to see Fluff, Ward takes her to the nightclub. By coincidence, McGraw is in a private room there, drunk and with a couple of girls. When Morgan shows up to get him, McGraw spots Ward and pushes him to the floor. The two are separated, but Ward offers to fight within the month. Newspaper photographers take pictures of Ward with both Marie and Fluff. As a result, Nick finally learns that Ward has been seeing his sister.

Infuriated, Nick secretly turns on his boxer, agreeing to a title bout. He orders Ward to come out slugging, knowing it is a losing strategy. When Morgan discovers that Nick has placed substantial bets against his own fighter, he visits Nick. He learns that Nick wants to get back at Ward, and decides to bet $150,000 himself. During the bout, Ward faithfully follows Nick's orders and is knocked down repeatedly by McGraw. Fluff and Marie attend the fight together. When Fluff realizes what Nick is doing, she and Marie plead with him to stop. Nick finally comes to his senses and changes tactics. In the end, Ward knocks McGraw out and becomes world heavyweight champion.

After the fight, an armed Morgan arranges to be alone in the changing room with Nick, Ward and Silver. Nick is prepared though, and also has a gun. They exchange shots, fatal on both sides. Before he dies, Nick gives his blessing to Ward and Marie.

Cast

 Edward G. Robinson as Nick Donati
 Bette Davis as Louise "Fluff" Phillips
 Humphrey Bogart as Turkey Morgan
 Wayne Morris as Ward Guisenberry "Kid Galahad"
 Jane Bryan as Marie Donati
 Harry Carey as Silver Jackson
 William Haade as Chuck McGraw
 Soledad Jiménez as Mrs. Donati
 Joe Cunningham as Joe Taylor, a reporter
 Ben Welden as Buzz Barett
 Joseph Crehan as Brady
 Veda Ann Borg as The Redhead
 Frank Faylen as Barney
 Harland Tucker as Gunman
 Bob Evans as Sam
 Hank Hankinson as Burke
 Bob Nestell as O'Brien
 Jack Kranz as Denbaugh
 George Blake as Referee

Production
According to his New York Times obituary of December 3, 1975, the playwright and screenwriter Lawrence Riley, famous for his Broadway hit Personal Appearance (basis of Mae West's Go West, Young Man), contributed to Kid Galahad'''s screenplay, but was uncredited.

Edward G. Robinson and Humphrey Bogart made five films together: Bullets or Ballots (1936), Kid Galahad (1937), The Amazing Dr. Clitterhouse (1938), Brother Orchid (1940) and Key Largo (1948) with Lauren Bacall, Claire Trevor and Lionel Barrymore.

ReceptionThe New York Times reviewer Frank S. Nugent applauded Morris's "natural and easy performance. Time Out considered the movie a "none too subtle exposition of the now well-worn theme of corruption in the boxing-ring", but conceded that "sleek direction and excellent performances keep it enjoyable." Dave Kehr of the Chicago Reader'' disagreed, characterizing it as "pretty much all genre and no nuance", but he found Curtiz's direction "surprising soft and light."

References

External links
 
 
 
 

1937 films
1937 crime films
1930s sports films
American crime films
American black-and-white films
American boxing films
1930s English-language films
Films based on short fiction
Films directed by Michael Curtiz
Films produced by Hal B. Wallis
Films produced by Samuel Bischoff
Films scored by Heinz Roemheld
Films scored by Max Steiner
Films set in New York City
Warner Bros. films
1930s American films